The 1980 Transamerica Open, also known as the Pacific Coast Championships, was a men's tennis tournament played on indoor carpet courts at the Cow Palace in San Francisco, California in the United States. The event was part of the Super Series of the 1980 Volvo Grand Prix circuit. It was the 92nd edition of the tournament and was held from September 22 through September 28, 1980. Third-seeded Gene Mayer won the singles title and earned $27,500 first-prize money.

Finals

Singles
 Gene Mayer defeated  Eliot Teltscher 6–2, 2–6, 6–1
 It was Mayer's 5th singles title of the year and the 7th of his career.

Doubles
 John McEnroe /  Peter Fleming defeated  Gene Mayer /  Sandy Mayer 6–1, 6–4

References

External links
 ITF tournament edition details

Transamerica Open
Pacific Coast International Open
Transamerica Open
Transamerica Open
Transamerica Open